Elias Tari (17 April 1926 - 29 April 1978) was the Governor of East Nusa Tenggara from 1966 to 1978. His name became the name of an airport in Kupang, El Tari Airport.

External links
 Website Bandara El Tari Kupang
 Berita

1926 births
1978 deaths
Governors of East Nusa Tenggara
People from Kupang
Indonesian Christians